Spy Kids is an American spy family action-adventure comedy franchise created by Robert Rodriguez. The plot follows adventures of Carmen and Juni Cortez, two children who become involved in their parents' espionage organization. The films include Latino themes, as Rodriguez is of Mexican descent.

Background

Influences 
Spy Kids was influenced by James Bond films. The first film was "a fusion of Willy Wonka and James Bond" and the second was the "Mysterious Island and James Bond mix".

The spy organization in the films is called the OSS. These initials are from the Office of Strategic Services, a former U.S. intelligence organization during World War II which later evolved into the CIA. The character Donnagon Giggles, was named after William Joseph Donovan, the director of the original OSS. The initials in the Spy Kids universe are never specified on screen, but, in one of the books, they stand for the Organization of Super Spies.

Themes 
One of the main themes of Spy Kids is the unity of family. The children have adult responsibilities, and a lesson is that keeping secrets from family members can have a negative effect on relationships. The first film also deals extensively with sibling rivalry and the responsibility of older children. There is also a strong sense of Latino heritage.

Technical innovations 
The other films were shot with High Definition digital video, parts of the third film using an anaglyphic process to create the 3-D effect. Audiences were given red/blue 3D glasses with their tickets in movie theatres. Four sets of these glasses were also included in the DVD release. The third film was used as a test for a special Texas Instruments digital projector which can project polarized 3D, which does not require the red-blue lenses, later reused for The Adventures of Sharkboy and Lavagirl in 3-D (2005).

Films

Spy Kids (2001) 

After retiring from espionage for ten years, Gregorio and Ingrid (Antonio Banderas and Carla Gugino) are pulled back into duty for their important assignment despite the fact they were out of practice, and were captured. Their two children, Carmen and Juni (Alexa Vega and Daryl Sabara), stay with their uncle Felix Gumm (Cheech Marin) and discover the truth of their parents' past, which they had neglected to tell them because they were afraid that if they knew, they would picture danger at every corner; and decide to rescue them. On their first mission, Carmen and Juni manage to bring around their estranged uncle, Isador "Machete" Cortez (Danny Trejo), a genius gadget inventor and Juni helps to redeem a TV show host named Fegan Floop (Alan Cumming). Together, Carmen and Juni thwart the plan of Floop's notorious second in-command Alexander Minion (Tony Shalhoub) to develop an army of androids resembling young children (including Carmen and Juni themselves) for a mastermind named Mr. Lisp (Robert Patrick) and his partner Ms. Gradenko (Teri Hatcher). The robots based on Carmen and Juni became part of Floop's show.

Spy Kids 2: The Island of Lost Dreams (2002) 

As agents of the OSS, Carmen and Juni try to save the daughter (Taylor Momsen) of The President Of The United States (Christopher McDonald) while facing a particularly hard competition with Gary and Gerti Giggles (Matt O'Leary and Emily Osment), the two children of a double-dealing agent Donnagon Giggles (Mike Judge), whom Carmen and Juni helped to rescue them from the first film. Juni gets fired from the OSS after fighting with Gary over a smaller version of the transmooker, a device that can shut off all electronic devices even though it was Gary who started the fight. Juni loses his spot for the best spy kid of the year award, while Donnagon plans to steal the transmooker to take over the world. On their second mission, Carmen and Juni follow the trail to the mysterious island of Leeke Leeke which is home to Romero (Steve Buscemi), an eccentric scientist who attempted to create genetically-miniaturised animals, but instead ended up with his island inhabited by mutant monsters. Eventually, Donnagon is fired and Gary is suspended, and the transmooker is destroyed. Juni is offered his job back, but in order to take a break from the OSS, he retires to start his own private eye agency.

Spy Kids 3-D: Game Over (2003) 

After retiring from the OSS, Juni is thrust back into service when an evil mastermind named Sebastian "The Toymaker" (Sylvester Stallone) creates a fictional video game called Game Over, which hypnotizes its users. Carmen was sent on a mission to disable the game, but disappeared on Level 4. With the help of his maternal grandfather, Valentin Avellan (Ricardo Montalban), who uses a wheelchair, Juni is sent after Carmen and helps her to disable the game in order to save the world. It is revealed that Sebastian was the one who disabled Valentin in the first place. Instead of avenging his former partner, Valentin forgives Sebastian who is redeemed.

Spy Kids: All the Time in the World (2011) 

The OSS has become the world's top spy agency, while the Spy Kids department has become defunct. A retired spy Marissa (Jessica Alba) is thrown back into the action along with her two stepchildren, Rebecca and Cecil (Rowan Blanchard and Mason Cook), when a maniacal Timekeeper (Jeremy Piven) attempts to take over the world. In order to save the world, Rebecca and Cecil must team up with Marissa.

Spy Kids: Armageddon (TBA) 

The fifth installment, Spy Kids: Armageddon, serving as a reboot of the franchise, is in development, with a film involving a plot that centers around a multicultural family. Robert Rodriguez again serves as writer/director, while the project is a joint-venture production between Skydance Media and Spyglass Media Group. The film is scheduled for distribution on Netflix, making it the second Spy Kids project produced for the platform. Gina Rodriguez, Zachary Levi, Everly Carganilla and Connor Esterson were set to star, along with Billy Magnussen and D. J. Cotrona. The plotline for the film is as follows: "When the children of the world's greatest secret agents unwittingly help a powerful Game Developer unleash a computer virus that gives him control of all technology, they must become spies themselves to save their parents and the world". Production of the film wrapped in late August 2022.

Television

Spy Kids: Mission Critical (2018) 

An animated series based on the films, Spy Kids: Mission Critical, was released on Netflix in 2018. The first and second seasons both consist of 10 episodes and is produced by Mainframe Studios. Robert Rodriguez served as one of the executive producers on the show.

Main cast and characters

Additional crew and production details

Reception

Box office performance

Critical and public response 
Though the first and second film received positive reviews, the series experienced a steadily declining critical reception with each film.

Home media 
 September 18, 2001 (Spy Kids) on DVD by Buena Vista Home Entertainment
 February 18, 2003 (Spy Kids 2: The Island of Lost Dreams) on DVD by Buena Vista Home Entertainment
 February 24, 2004 (Spy Kids 3D: Game Over) on DVD by Buena Vista Home Entertainment
 August 2, 2011 (Spy Kids, Spy Kids 2: The Island of Lost Dreams, and Spy Kids 3-D: Game Over) on DVD and Blu-ray Disc by Lionsgate (However, all 3 DVDs are still the original Buena Vista Home Entertainment copies.)
 November 15, 2011 (Spy Kids, Spy Kids 2: The Island of Lost Dreams, and Spy Kids 3-D: Game Over Triple Feature) on Blu-ray Disc by Lionsgate
 November 22, 2011 (Spy Kids: All the Time in the World) on DVD and Blu-ray by Anchor Bay Entertainment
 December 4, 2012 (Spy Kids 3-D: Game Over, The Adventures of Sharkboy and Lavagirl in 3-D 3D Double Feature) on Blu-ray 3D Disc by Lionsgate
 September 22, 2020 (Spy Kids, Spy Kids 2: The Island of Lost Dreams, and Spy Kids 3-D: Game Over Triple Feature) on Blu-ray Disc reissue by Paramount

Other media

Video games
 Spy Kids Challenger (Game Boy Advance)
 Spy Kids Mega Mission Zone (PC/Mac)
 Spy Kids 3-D: Game Over (Game Boy Advance and PC/Mac)
 Spy Kids: Learning Adventures series (PC/Mac)
 Spy Kids: All the Time in the World (Nintendo DS)

See also

Related film series 
Isador "Machete" Cortez, who appeared in all four Spy Kids film series as a supporting character, additionally had a series of two stand-alone films: Machete and Machete Kills, also written and directed by Robert Rodriguez. However, the Machete films share little in common with the Spy Kids films thematically and are not considered direct spin-offs, the first film instead being an adult-oriented action exploitation film, with the second film introducing science fiction elements; both films additionally share several cast members and characters with the Spy Kids films. The idea for a Machete film came from a fake trailer promoting the Grindhouse double-feature by Rodriguez and Quentin Tarantino. Trejo and Rodriguez have made two conflicting statements regarding its canonicity to the Spy Kids films; Trejo claimed that the films depict "what Uncle Machete does when he's not taking care of the kids", while Rodriguez said in a Reddit AMA that they are alternate universes. Regardless, Rodriguez claimed that he was prompted by an incident on the set of the first Machete film to start envisioning a fourth film in the main Spy Kids film series, casting Jessica Alba as Machete's sister Marissa, a different character to the one she portrayed in Machete, with Trejo additionally reprising his role alongside her.

Notes 

 The Walt Disney Company had to cut their own share on the fourth film with The Weinstein Company to 5% after the latter party lost their bid to reclaim Miramax Films.

References 

 
American children's films
Films directed by Robert Rodriguez
Fictional secret agents and spies
Action film franchises
Comedy film franchises
Spy film series
Children's film series
Dimension Films films
Miramax franchises
Paramount Pictures franchises